The Coalman Glacier (also Coleman Glacier) is a glacier located on the upper slopes of Mount Hood in the U.S. state of Oregon. It was named for Elija Coalman (variously spelled Elijah Coleman), an early mountain guide who climbed Mount Hood 586 times.

Coalman Glacier is the second most frequently visited glacier on the mountain because it is part of the popular South Climbing route from Timberline Lodge.  It lies entirely within Mount Hood Wilderness.  The most well known feature of Coalman is the Hogsback:  a snow ridge running southwest to northeast from Crater Rock toward the summit ridge.  The Bergschrund is another widely known feature where the glacier pulls away from the stagnant ice leaving a large crevasse.  In 2007, it had become large enough to cause most climbers to use another route.

The glacier is a remnant of the massive glaciers that formed during the last ice age.  It is historically known to change configuration dramatically, at times a gradual, smooth surface to Hot Rocks; at other times the same place has a 40 ft (12 m) ice cliff.

The glacier flows southwest, and is bounded on the north and east by the summit, on the northwest by the rocky crater wall known as Castle Crags (also Hawkins Cliffs), on the west by Hot Rocks, and on southeast by the back side of Steel Cliff.

See also
List of glaciers in the United States

References

Glaciers of Mount Hood
Glaciers of Clackamas County, Oregon
Glaciers of Hood River County, Oregon
Mount Hood National Forest
Glaciers of Oregon